The 2014 Men's Hockey World Cup was the 13th edition of the Hockey World Cup, the quadrennial world championship for men's national field hockey teams organized by the FIH. It was held from 31 May to 15 June 2014 at the Kyocera Stadion in The Hague, Netherlands. simultaneously with the women's tournament. It was the third time that the Netherlands hosted the World Cup after 1973 and 1998.

Defending champions Australia won the tournament for the third time after defeating the Netherlands 6–1 in the final. Argentina won the third place match by defeating England 2–0 to claim their first ever World Cup medal.

Bidding
The host was announced on 11 November 2010 during the FIH Congress and Forum in Montreux, Switzerland after FIH received bids from The Hague and London.

Qualification
Each of the continental champions from five confederations and the host nation received an automatic berth. In addition to the six highest placed teams at the Semifinals of the 2012–13 FIH Hockey World League not already qualified, the following twelve teams, shown with final pre-tournament rankings, will compete in this tournament.

Squads

Umpires
17 umpires were appointed by the FIH for this tournament.

Christian Blasch (GER)
Marcin Grochal (POL)
Hamish Jamson (ENG)
Adam Kearns (AUS)
Kim Hong-lae (KOR)
Martin Madden (SCO)
Germán Montes de Oca (ARG)
Tim Pullman (AUS)
Raghu Prasad (IND)
Javed Shaikh (IND)
Gary Simmonds (RSA)
Nathan Stagno (GIB)
Simon Taylor (NZL)
Roel van Eert (NED)
Paco Vázquez (ESP)
Roderick Wijsmuller (NED)
John Wright (RSA)

Results
All times are Central European Summer Time (UTC+02:00)

First round

Pool A

Pool B

Fifth to twelfth place classification

Eleventh and twelfth place

Ninth and tenth place

Seventh and eighth place

Fifth and sixth place

First to fourth place classification

Semi-finals

Third and fourth place

Final

Statistics

Final standings

Awards

Goalscorers

References

External links
Official website

 
Men's Hockey World Cup
World Cup
International field hockey competitions hosted by the Netherlands
Hockey World Cup Men
Sports competitions in The Hague
21st century in The Hague
Hockey World Cup Men
Hockey World Cup Men